Queens: The Virgin and the Martyr is a Spanish and British historical drama television series created by José Luis Moreno, and produced by Televisión Española and the BBC, with a Spanish and British cast.

Cast 
 Olivia Chenery as Mary Stuart
 Rebecca Scott as Elizabeth I of England
 Tom Christian as Robert Dudley
 Harry Jarvis as Lord Darnley
 Adrián Castiñeiras as Philip II of Spain
 Fernando Gil as Grand Duke of Alba
 Laura Ledesma as Isabel de Valois
 Carlos Camino as David Rizzio
 Nick Cornwall as John Dee
 Leo Hatton as Lady Ann
 Landher Iturbe as Carlos, Prince of Asturias
 Steve Howard as Pope Pius V
  Alejandra Onieva as lady in waiting Ana of Austria
  Paloma Bloyd as Joanna of Austria

Seasons

First season

Reception 
The series has been criticised for having low quality production values, in spite of its budget of around €2 million per episode. Another cause of controversy was that the series was filmed in English and then dubbed into Spanish. Finally,  there were irregularities with the credits, with some scriptwriters who were named on the script for the pilot episode do not feature on the show's credits, or have a page on IMDb.

References

External links 
  
 List of complete seasons 

2017 Spanish television series debuts
2017 Spanish television series endings
Monarchy in fiction
RTVE shows
2010s Spanish drama television series
Television series set in the 16th century
Cultural depictions of Elizabeth I
Cultural depictions of Mary, Queen of Scots